Carlos André Avelino de Lima, known as André Catimba (30 October 1946 – 28 July 2021) was a Brazilian professional footballer who played for EC Ypiranga, Vitória, Guarani, Grêmio and Argentinos Juniors.

References

1946 births
2021 deaths
Sportspeople from Salvador, Bahia
Brazilian footballers
Esporte Clube Ypiranga players
Esporte Clube Vitória players
Guarani FC players
Grêmio Foot-Ball Porto Alegrense players
Argentinos Juniors footballers
Brazilian expatriate footballers
Brazilian expatriate sportspeople in Argentina
Expatriate footballers in Argentina
Association footballers not categorized by position